Arthur Allison Wishart,  (June 11, 1903 – November 23, 1986) was a politician and in the Legislative Assembly of Ontario from 1963 to 1971. He was a Progressive Conservative member who served in the cabinets of John Robarts and Bill Davis.

Background
Born in New Brunswick, Wishart obtained his law degree from Osgoode Hall Law School in 1930, and then practised in Windsor and Blind River.

Politics
He served as mayor of Blind River before moving to Sault Ste. Marie.

In the 1963 provincial election, he was elected the Progressive Conservative Party of Ontario Member of Provincial Parliament (MPP) for Sault Ste. Marie.

He entered the cabinet within a year as Attorney General of Ontario under then Premier John Robarts. He served in that senior cabinet portfolio for seven years, and is credited with shepherding many important pieces of legislation, including the Legal Aid Act of 1966 and the Law Enforcement Compensation Act of 1967.

In 1967, Wishart fired Morton Shulman from his position as Chief Coroner of Metropolitan Toronto as a result of Shulman's criticisms of the government's failure to follow various recommendations made in coroner's inquiries. The dismissal propelled Shulman, until then a long-time Tory, into politics as a candidate and then MPP for the New Democratic Party.

In early 1971, Wishart became Minister of Financial and Consumer Affairs under Robarts's successor, Bill Davis, and served until retiring from politics at the 1971 provincial election.

Wishart was very active on the issue of franchises while he was Minister of Finance and Minister of Consumer and Commercial Affairs. He initiated the Grange Commission, an inquiry held into the financial abuse of franchisees by franchisors. The Arthur Wishart (Franchise Disclosure) Act, passed in 2000 was named in his honour.

Cabinet positions

Later life
After leaving politics, he served the province as chairman of the Criminal Injuries Compensation Board and later of the Commission on Election Contributions and Expenses.  He returned to Queen's Park in 1973 as a liaison between Premier Davis and the Progressive Conservative caucus.

Wishart was a supporter of Sault Ste. Marie's local university, Algoma University, and in 1989 a new wing was built at Algoma to house the Arthur A. Wishart Library.

In 1976, he was made a Member of the Order of Canada. He died on November 23, 1986.

References

External links
 
Ontario Hansard - 23-October1986 
Ontario Hansard - 24-November1986

1903 births
1986 deaths
Attorneys General of Ontario
Members of the Order of Canada
People from Queens County, New Brunswick
People from Sault Ste. Marie, Ontario
Progressive Conservative Party of Ontario MPPs
20th-century Canadian lawyers